Bom Retiro (literally meaning "good retreat") may refer to:
Bom Retiro, São Paulo, a district of São Paulo, Brazil
Bom Retiro, Santa Catarina, a Brazilian city in the state Santa Catarina
Bom Retiro do Sul, a municipality Rio Grande do Sul, Brazil
Bom Retiro River, Brazil